Sumner is a city in Bremer County, Iowa, United States.  The city is located along the county's eastern border, between Bremer and Fayette counties. The population was 2,021 at the time of the 2020 census. The Bremer County portion of Sumner is part of the Waterloo–Cedar Falls Metropolitan Statistical Area.

The town was established in 1870, and incorporated in 1894.  The community is named after American political leader Charles Sumner.

Sumner is home to  Life Line Emergency Vehicles, a major manufacturer of ambulances.

Geography

Sumner is located on Iowa Highway 93.

Demographics

2010 census
As of the census of 2010, there were 2,028 people, 869 households, and 555 families living in the city. The racial makeup of the city was 98.5% White, 0.8% Asian, 0.1% from other races, and 0.6% from two or more races. Hispanic or Latino of any race were 0.7% of the population.

There were 869 households, of which 27.0% had children under the age of 18 living with them, 53.4% were married couples living together, 7.6% had a female householder with no husband present, 2.9% had a male householder with no wife present, and 36.1% were non-families. 33.0% of all households were made up of individuals, and 18.3% had someone living alone who was 65 years of age or older. The average household size was 2.24 and the average family size was 2.83.

The median age in the city was 45.3 years. 22% of residents were under the age of 18; 5.9% were between the ages of 18 and 24; 21.7% were from 25 to 44; 25% were from 45 to 64; and 25.4% were 65 years of age or older. The gender makeup of the city was 45.8% male and 54.2% female.

2000 census
As of the census of 2000, there were 2,106 people, 888 households, and 575 families living in the city. The racial makeup of the city was 98.96% White, 0.19% African American, 0.43% Asian, 0.05% Pacific Islander, 0.09% from other races, and 0.28% from two or more races. Hispanic or Latino of any race were 0.66% of the population.

There were 888 households, out of which 27.1% had children under the age of 18 living with them, 55.9% were married couples living together, 6.3% had a female householder with no husband present, and 35.2% were non-families. 32.1% of all households were made up of individuals, and 20.6% had someone living alone who was 65 years of age or older. The average household size was 2.28 and the average family size was 2.88.

In the city, the population was spread out, with 22.9% under the age of 18, 6.1% from 18 to 24, 22.9% from 25 to 44, 23.2% from 45 to 64, and 24.9% who were 65 years of age or older. The median age was 44 years. For every 100 females, there were 88.5 males. For every 100 females age 18 and over, there were 80.4 males.

The median income for a household in the city was $33,417, and the median income for a family was $44,318. Males had a median income of $29,224 versus $20,901 for females. The per capita income for the city was $18,029. About 2.2% of families and 4.2% of the population were below the poverty line, including 5.3% of those under age 18 and 5.4% of those age 65 or over.

Historic sites

There are many historic buildings in Sumner, including the old bank/clock tower, and the old school building, which was built in 1901 and is currently a museum.  Sumner has recently built a new library, recreation center, and a park for residents.

Education
It is within the Sumner-Fredericksburg Community School District, which was formed by the merger of Sumner Community School District and Fredericksburg Community School District in 2014. Sumner-Fredericksburg High School in Sumner is the community high school.

Notable people
 Mary Louise Boehm - pianist and painter.
 Randi Oakes, actress and model, best known for her role as Officer Bonnie Clark on the television series CHiPs.
 Les Tietje, Major League Baseball starting pitcher who played from 1933 to 1938 for the Chicago White Sox and St. Louis Browns.
 Loy Young, college football coach.

References

External links
Official website

Cities in Bremer County, Iowa
Cities in Fayette County, Iowa
Cities in Iowa
Waterloo – Cedar Falls metropolitan area
1870 establishments in Iowa
Populated places established in 1870